Deinodon (Greek for "terrible tooth") is a dubious tyrannosaurid dinosaur genus containing a single species, Deinodon horridus. D. horridus is known only from a set of teeth found in the Late Cretaceous Judith River Formation of Montana and named by paleontologist Joseph Leidy in 1856. These were the first tyrannosaurid remains to be described and had been collected by Ferdinand Vandeveer Hayden. The teeth of Deinodon were slightly heterodont, and the holotype of Aublysodon can probably be assigned to Deinodon.

History and classification
 
It is likely that the fossilized teeth of D. horridus belonged to the dinosaur later identified as Gorgosaurus libratus. In a 1922 study, William Diller Matthew & Barnum Brown found that the teeth of D. horridus and G. libratus were indistinguishable from each other, and that they almost certainly belonged to the same species. However, because D. horridus was not yet known from any skeletal remains, they refrained from formally declaring them to be synonyms. In a 1970 review, Dale Russell stated that because the teeth of D. horridus could not be distinguished from either G. libratus or his newly described species Daspletosaurus torosus, it must be considered a nomen vanum ("empty name"). Since Russell published his opinion, most researchers have regarded Deinodon as a nomen dubium, though some have argued that since Deinodon and Gorgosaurus cannot be distinguished, they should be synonymized with D. horridus as the valid name for "Gorgosaurus" skeletons. Additionally, several researchers have agreed that the genus Aublysodon (including the species A. mirandus and A. lateralis), should also be considered a synonym of Deinodon, since it is based on incisor teeth that likely come from the same animal. Lambe (1902) went further, and said that as originally named, Deinodon was not preoccupied, and instead, regarded Aublysodon as a nomen nudum.

Description
Deinodon is known from a few, slightly heterodont teeth.

A few phalanges, and a metatarsal with fragments of others, were found to be possibly assignable to D. horridus by Lambe in 1902.

List of species and synonyms
Numerous species were  referred to the genus Deinodon in the past. However, because most researchers now consider the genus and its type species nomina dubia, any additional species referred to the genus cannot be supported.

See also

 Timeline of tyrannosaur research

References

Late Cretaceous dinosaurs of North America
Tyrannosaurids
Nomina dubia
Fossil taxa described in 1856
Paleontology in Montana
Campanian genus first appearances
Campanian genus extinctions